Delgrado School, also known as Washington Catlett School, is a historic school building located at Wilmington, New Hanover County, North Carolina. It was built 1914, and is a one-story, Classical Revival style red brick building with a low-pitched gable and hip roof.  Additions were made to the original building in 1924 (auditorium and central classrooms), 1938 (east and west wings) and 1953 (kitchen).  It was built as part of the Delgado Mill Village.  The 1938 addition was built as a Public Works Administration project.

It was listed on the National Register of Historic Places in 2001.

References

Public Works Administration in North Carolina
School buildings on the National Register of Historic Places in North Carolina
Neoclassical architecture in North Carolina
School buildings completed in 1914
Schools in Wilmington, North Carolina
National Register of Historic Places in New Hanover County, North Carolina
1914 establishments in North Carolina